The 1891 Cork Senior Hurling Championship was the fifth staging of the Cork Senior Hurling Championship since its establishment by the Cork County Board in 1887.

Aghabullogue were the defending champions, however, they decided not to field a team and granted a walkover to Inniscarra. For the first time ever the championship was divided along divisional lines. The champion clubs of the four divisions contested the county championship.

On 31 May 1891, Blackrock won the championship following a 4-04 to 0-00 defeat of Inniscarra in the final. This was their third championship title overall and their first title in two years.

Results

Semi-finals

Final

Championship statistics

Miscellaneous

 It was reported in The Nation newspaper that the attendance of 16,000 at the Blackrock-St. Finbarr's game was a then record for a hurling game in Ireland.
Blackrock win their title on the field of play.

References

Cork Senior Hurling Championship
Cork Senior Hurling Championship